Lia Joëlle Wälti (born 19 April 1993) is a Swiss professional footballer who plays as a midfielder for FA Women's Super League club Arsenal Women and Switzerland national team. She is the captain of Switzerland national team and the third captain of Arsenal Women, she was also the captain of her previous club Turbine Potsdam. Before signed for Arsenal Women in July 2018, she played professionally for Nationalliga A's club YB Frauen from 2009 until 2013 and for Frauen-Bundesliga's club Turbine Potsdam from 2013 until 2018.

She has been a member of the Switzerland national team since August 2011. As an Under-19 international she played the 2009 U-19 European Championship and the 2010 U-20 World Cup.

Club career

Early career
In her childhood, Wälti played ice hockey as well as football. In 2002, at the age of 8, she started playing for FC Langnau, a boys football team coached by her father. In 2007 she was admitted to the Huttwill Training Centre and, half a year later, she joined Team Bern West. In 2009 she moved to BSC Young Boys, where she played for a year in the U16 boys' team.

FC Köniz (2008–2009)
At the same time she played for Team Bern West, Wälti joined FC Köniz of the Swiss Challenge League.

BSC YB Frauen (2009–2013)
In 2009, Wälti joined BSC YB Frauen, where, in 2011, she won the Nationalliga A. In the same year, she debuted in the UEFA Women's Champions League.

Turbine Potsdam (2013–2018)
In 2013, Wälti signed a contract with 1. FFC Turbine Potsdam of the Frauen-Bundesliga. She was named captain in her second season and played 110 games between 2013 and 2018.

Arsenal (2018–)
After 110 appearances with the German team, Wälti signed a contract with Arsenal in July 2018. Wälti was instrumental in Arsenal's 2018–2019 WSL league winning season although only played half of the season after she suffered a LCL injury which kept her out of football for 9 months In April 2019. She included in 2018-2019 PFA Team of the Year. On 13 December 2019, Wälti signed a long-term contract with the club.

International career

Youth
Wälti played in the 2008 UEFA Women's Under-17 Championship. She also played for the Switzerland U19 team in 2008 and 2009. She reached the semifinals in the 2009 UEFA Women's Under-19 Championship. The next year, she joined the U20 team at the 2010 FIFA U-20 Women's World Cup.

Senior
On 21 August 2011, Wälti made her debut for the Switzerland senior team in a match against Scotland.

In 2015, she played at the World Cup.
In 2019 after the retirement of Lara Dickerman, she was named captain.

Career statistics

Club

International
Scores and results list Switzerland's goal tally first, score column indicates score after each Wälti goal.

Honours
BSC YB Frauen
 Nationalliga A: 2010–11

Turbine Potsdam
 DFB-Pokal Frauen runners-up: 2014–15

Arsenal
 FA WSL: 2018–19
 FA WSL Cup / FA Women's League Cup: 2022–23; runners-up: 2018–19, 2019–20

Individual
PFA Team of the Year: 2018–19
Swiss Female National Player: 2021

References

External links
 

1993 births
Living people
1. FFC Turbine Potsdam players
Swiss women's footballers
Swiss expatriate sportspeople in Germany
Swiss expatriate sportspeople in England
Expatriate women's footballers in Germany
Expatriate footballers in England
Switzerland women's international footballers
Women's association football defenders
Women's association football midfielders
Arsenal W.F.C. players
Women's Super League players
People from Emmental District
Frauen-Bundesliga players
BSC YB Frauen players
2015 FIFA Women's World Cup players
Swiss Women's Super League players
Sportspeople from the canton of Bern
UEFA Women's Euro 2022 players
FIFA Century Club
UEFA Women's Euro 2017 players
Swiss expatriate women's footballers